A game of skill or game of wits is a game where the outcome is determined mainly by mental or physical skill, rather than chance.

Alternatively, a game of chance is one where its outcome is strongly influenced by some randomizing device, such as dice, spinning tops, playing cards, roulette wheels, or numbered balls drawn from a container.

While a game of chance may have some skill element to it, chance generally plays a greater role in determining its outcome. A game of skill may also have elements of chance, but skill plays a greater role in determining its outcome.

Some commonly played games of skill include: collectible card games, contract bridge, backgammon and mahjong.

However, most games of skill also involve a degree of chance, due to natural aspects of the environment, a randomizing device (such as dice, playing cards or a coin flip), or guessing due to incomplete information. Some games where skill is a component alongside gambling and strategy such as poker may involve the application of such methods as mathematical probability and game theory, bluffing, and other forms of psychological warfare.

Legal meaning
The distinction between "chance" and "skill" has legal significance in countries where chance games are treated differently from skill games. The legal distinction is often vague and varies widely from one jurisdiction to the next.

In Germany, whether a game is considered of skill has legal implications with respect to whether money bets on the game's outcome are considered gambling or not. For example, poker is legally considered a game of chance in Germany (thus only allowed in casinos), whereas a tournament of skat is considered a game of skill and competitions with money prizes are allowed.  Alternatively, poker has been ruled by a New York judge as a game of skill rather than chance.

Examples of games of skill

Games of skill requiring special equipment (selection) 
 Air hockey
 Billiards
 Pinball machine
 Skee ball
 Snooker
 Table football
 Table ice hockey
 Whac-A-Mole

With the increasing spread of computer games, a lot of software of this genre was also created. Originally, these were mainly so-called jump'n'run games. However, the range has long since expanded and now also includes games with a greater strategic component, for example the various Tetris variants. In contrast to the non-virtual skill game, which usually involves the entire body, eye-hand coordination is required here. Encouraging player responsiveness and imagination is controversial. Nevertheless, various online skill games and jump'n'run adventures also find a place in child psychotherapeutic work.

See also

 Casino game
 Game of chance
 Mind sport
 Matching game
 Memory sport
 Strategy game
 List of types of games

References

External link

Game terminology
Skills